The Col de Prato is a mountain pass in the Haute-Corse department of Corsica, France.

Location

It is in the Monte San Petrone massif, to the north of the  Monte San Petrone.
The D71 road from Morosaglia to the northwest runs through the pass and continues south and then east to the coast near Valle-di-Campoloro.

It crosses between the valley of the Casaluna, a tributary of the Golo, and the valley of the Fium'Alto. 
The Ruisseau de Campo di Melo rises on its western side.
This flows into the Ruisseau de  Conca (called the Prunitaccio downstream), a tributary of the Casaluna.
The Ruisseau de Lavatoio et de Noceta rises on the eastern side of the pass, which successively joins with other streams before ending up in the Fium’Alto.

Geology

The Prato Pass is located in the "Alpine Corsica" composed of glazed shales and green rocks (ophiolites), on the ridge of the Monte San Petrone massif.
"South of Quercitello is the Prato Pass (altitude 974 m.); there is a quarry there in a gray, phyllite limestone, giving a good stone for paving roads. This limestone is in the lens state at the top of the white mica shales; the benches slope to the west. These shale sediments with limestone banks exist between the Prato Pass and Morosaglia where they are sometimes cut by gabbro-serpentine veins."

Notes

Sources

 

 

Mountain passes of Haute-Corse